Jack Umaga (born 18 June 1984) is a New Zealand-born Romanian rugby union football player. He plays in the wing or centre positions for amateur Liga Națională de Rugby club Știința Petroșani. 

He also played for Romania's national team, the Oaks, making his international debut at the 2016 World Rugby Nations Cup in a match against the Welwitschias.

Career
Jack Umaga played for Sydenhan Rugby, Canterbury B, Mid-Canterbury, Tasman Makos and most recently for Hino Motors.

After joining Timișoara, Jack Umaga won the Romanian league 4 times and the Romanian cup also 4 times. He was also selected 17 times to play for the Romanian National Team.

Honours
Timișoara
 Liga Națională de Rugby: 2013, 2015, 2017, 2018
 Cupa României: 2014, 2015, 2016, 2021

References

External links

 Jack Umaga at Timișoara Saracens website

1984 births
Living people
Romanian rugby union players
Romania international rugby union players
SCM Rugby Timișoara players
New Zealand rugby union players
New Zealand sportspeople of Samoan descent
Rugby union wings
Rugby union centres
Rugby union players from Wellington City